Tring School is a secondary school with academy status, with approximately 1,500 students aged between 11 and 18. It is located on Mortimer Hill on the east side of the town of Tring, Hertfordshire, England. Tring School includes a Sixth Form with over 300 students. The school was founded by the Church of England and is within the Diocesan Board of Education of the St Albans Diocese.

History 
In the early 19th century, the only education local children received was from the church-run school of St Peter and St Paul's, which taught around 240 pupils together in the Vestry Hall. However this was insufficient because the school only operated on Sundays and, in the opinion of the Brougham inspectors of 1811 at least, was severely unprovided for in comparison with Long Marston school, which contained only 92 students.

Tring National School was founded in 1842 by Church of England Revd Edward I. Randolph, with the assistance of a grant from the National Society, on land granted by the Dean and Chapter of Christ Church, Oxford. At that time it was built on Aylesbury Road in the middle of Tring, where Tring Library now stands.

During the First World War, the school building was taken over as a military hospital.

In the 1930s the junior and secondary departments were re-organised as separate schools, though still occupying the same building. The junior school would later become Bishop Wood C of E Junior School. In 1956 the senior school, now known as Tring School, moved to its present site at the top of Mortimer Hill, to the east of the town, and in 1969 it was re-organised as an all-ability 11–19 co-educational school.

The school converted to academy status in August 2012 and then became part of the Ridgeway Learning Partnership in December 2017.

Academic standards 
Following the Ofsted inspection in November 2017, Tring School was rated ‘Good’ with an ‘Outstanding’ Sixth Form and ‘Outstanding’ Personal Development and ‘Outstanding’ Behaviour.  The school was also rated ‘Good’ under the SIAMS inspection framework in May 2019 with ‘Outstanding’ Religious Education.

Wider Curriculum 
Clubs are led by staff and students alike and the school also hosts clubs run by external providers such as Air Cadets.  Increasing in popularity is the Duke of Edinburgh Scheme and World Challenge programmes.

House System

The students of the school are separated into four houses, namely Ascott, Claydon, Halton and Waddesdon all of which are country houses from the local area, each of which has its own Head of House. They compete annually for a House Cup as well as for other cups and trophies throughout the year with the cup being presented at the end of year assembly.

Since September 2009 Tring School's form system has incorporated vertical tutoring, with each tutor group including pupils from the same house and either KS3 or KS4/KS5.

The previous house system consisted of Ashridge, Beacon, Chiltern, Mentmore, Pendley and Ridgeway.

Multi Academy Trust 
Tring School is part of the Ridgeway Learning Partnership which also includes Dundale Primary School & Nursery and Grove Road Primary School. Tring School has transition links with other local primary schools.

Alumni
Lawrence Ward, former Serjeant at Arms of the British House of Commons was a pupil from 1979 until 1984.

References

External links 
 
Department for Education Performance Tables
Diocese of St Albans SIAMS (Statutory Inspections)

Secondary schools in Hertfordshire
Educational institutions established in 1842
Tring
Church of England secondary schools in the Diocese of St Albans
Academies in Hertfordshire
1842 establishments in England